The Experimental Guitar Series Volume 1: The Guitar as Orchestra is the ninth solo album by Adrian Belew, released in 1995). It was his first all-instrumental/experimental album since 1986's Desire Caught By the Tail.

The album was originally intended to be the first in a series of Experimental Guitar albums expressing musical concepts that would otherwise not be released by conventional recording labels. All ten compositions - performed by Belew on a custom Fender Stratocaster and utilizing such technical elements as Roland guitar synthesizers, Korg guitar processors, and Roland delays (to name a handful of production components) - could be categorized as "difficult listening music" (to use a term created by performance artist and Belew-contemporary Laurie Anderson).

According to the liner notes:

While Belew was hopeful that this album would be appreciated, the majority of critics did not know what to make of this avant-garde work, and the combined severity or indifference of criticism seems to have discouraged Belew's intention to continue with the Experimental Guitar series. Although there had been plans to create a second release entitled The Animal Kingdom, there has been no word of this subsequent effort either being created or released.

This album was released under the imprimatur of "Adrian Belew Presents", in coordination with Discipline Global Mobile.

Track listing
All compositions written by Adrian Belew
"Score with No Film" – 3:24
"Portrait of the Guitarist as a Young Drum" – 7:23
"Piano Recital" – 1:43
"Laurence Harvey's Despair" – 2:49
"Piano Ballet" – 3:36
"Rings Around the Moon" – 3:56
"Seven E Flat Elephants Eating the Acacia of a C# Minor Forest" – 7:20
"If Only..." – 5:06
"Alfred Hitchcock's "Strangers on a Train" Starring Robert Walker" – 9:44
"Finale" – 5:42

Personnel
Adrian Belew – guitars, additional instrumentation and production.
Noah Evens – engineer, photography

References

1995 albums
Adrian Belew albums
Albums produced by Adrian Belew
Discipline Global Mobile albums